Louise-Jeanne Du Londel, later Lefebvre (1740 - Stockholm 1777), was a French actor, active in the Du Londel Troupe at the Swedish royal court in 1753–1771.

She was born to the theater director Jeanne Du Londel and arrived in Sweden with her mother's theater in 1753. She became one of the most popular actors of the French court theater. She was described as a favorite of the royal court, was granted her own carriage, dresser and other privileges, and was appointed teacher in French for princess Sophia Albertina of Sweden, with her sister-in-law Marguerite Morel becoming dance teacher for the princess.

She married her colleague Pierre Lefebvre.

References 

 Forser, Tomas & Heed, Sven Åke (red.), Ny svensk teaterhistoria. 1, Teater före 1800, Gidlund, Hedemora, 2007 
 Löfgren, Lars, Svensk teater, Natur och kultur, Stockholm, 2003 
 Fredrik August Dahlgren: Förteckning öfver svenska skådespel uppförda på Stockholms theatrar 1737-1863 och Kongl. Theatrarnes personal 1773-1863. Med flera anteckningar. 

1740 births
1777 deaths
18th-century French actresses
French stage actresses
18th-century Swedish actresses
Swedish stage actresses
Expatriate actresses in Sweden
Swedish courtiers
Age of Liberty people